Vice Admiral Sir Geoffrey Blake,  (16 September 1882 – 18 July 1968) was an officer in the Royal Navy who served as Fourth Sea Lord from 1932 to 1935.

Naval career
Blake was born at Alverstoke in Hampshire, the son of Thomas Blake and Fanny Leatry. As a boy, he attended Winchester College before entering the Royal Navy in 1897. He served in the First World War and at the Battle of Jutland, as gunnery commander aboard .

In 1919, Blake was appointed naval attaché in Washington D. C., a position he held until 1921. He was appointed Chief of Staff in the Atlantic Fleet in 1927 and First Member of the New Zealand Naval Board and Commodore commanding the New Zealand Division in 1929.

Blake convened the first inquiry into the sinking of HMS Hood in 1941; the conduct of the inquiry was criticised as no record of witnesses' testimony was kept. A second inquiry was held, which came to the same conclusion although subsequently other theories have been advanced.

Blake also served in the Second World War as an Additional Assistant Chief of Naval Staff from 1940 and as Flag Officer, Liaison to the United States Navy in Europe from 1942 to 1945.

In retirement, Blake became Gentleman Usher of the Black Rod.

Family
In 1911 Blake married Jean St. John Carr; they had two daughters, one of whom married the historian John Ehrman.

References

|-

|-

Royal Navy admirals of World War II
Companions of the Distinguished Service Order
Knights Commander of the Order of the Bath
Royal Navy vice admirals
People educated at Winchester College
Royal Navy officers of World War I
Lords of the Admiralty
Ushers of the Black Rod
Military personnel from Hampshire
1882 births
1968 deaths
Admiralty personnel of World War II